Turks and Caicos Creole is an English-based creole spoken in the Turks and Caicos Islands, a West Indian British overseas territory in the Lucayan Archipelago.

The Turks and Caicos Island Creole variety has not been thoroughly studied but may be directly related to Bahamian Creole as one of its dialects as the two are reportedly highly mutually intelligible. As of 1995, the number of speakers of Turks and Caicos Islands Creole is around 10,700, although decreasing and endangered. It seems to be shifting to a variety form of Caribbean English. Turks and Caicos Islands Creole does not have an official status.

Phrases

References

Turks and Caicos Islands culture
Languages of the Turks and Caicos Islands
English-based pidgins and creoles
Creoles of the Caribbean
English language in the Caribbean
Languages of the United Kingdom
Endangered pidgins and creoles
Languages of the African diaspora